Alexandra Jean Theresa "Allie" DiMeco (born June 12, 1992) is an American actress, reality television personality, multi-instrumentalist, and model primarily known for playing the role of Nat Wolff's main love interest Rosalina in the Nickelodeon musical comedy series The Naked Brothers Band.

Career
DiMeco started acting and modeling at the age of five. DiMeco played piano, bass guitar and cello in the Nickelodeon series The Naked Brothers Band. She also starred in The Naked Brothers Band: The Movie.

Other acting credits include the Late Show with David Letterman, One Life to Live, Saturday Night Live, The King and I (National Tour) as Princess Ying Yawolak. She was nominated for a Young Artist Award for 2008 for her work in The Naked Brothers Band ensemble cast.

She attended Florida International University where she obtained her Bachelor of Arts in communication, journalism, and related programs in 2014 and her Master of Arts in mass communication and media studies in 2018.

Filmography

References

External links

1992 births
American child actresses
American child singers
American television actresses
Living people
The Naked Brothers Band members
Actors from Waterbury, Connecticut
21st-century American singers
Florida International University alumni
21st-century American actresses